Sulzberger Bay is a bay between Fisher Island and Vollmer Island, along the coast of King Edward VII Land. Discovered by the Byrd Antarctic Expedition on December 5, 1929, and named by Byrd for Arthur H. Sulzberger, publisher of The New York Times, a supporter of the Byrd expeditions in 1928–1930 and 1933–1935.

The ice shelf was observed and roughly mapped by the Byrd Antarctic Expedition (1928–1930).

Sulzberger Basin is an undersea basin on the central Ross shelf named in association with the Sulzberger Bay.

Iceberg formation

The ice shelf released icebergs within a day of the 2011 Tōhoku earthquake and tsunami. The main iceberg was approximately the area of Manhattan Island. In total, the icebergs calved from the ice shelf totalled an area of nearly 125 km2 (48 mi2). This section of the shelf had not moved since 1946.

Features
Ford Ranges

References

External links
Japan's Tsunami Rips Icebergs Double the Size of Manhattan From Antarctica
Tsunami Broke Antarctic Ice Shelf — Discovery News
Japan Tsunami Broke Off Icebergs in Antarctica — Wired.com

Bays of Antarctica
King Edward VII Land